The Scottish–Norwegian War lasted from 1262 to 1266. The conflict arose because of disagreement over the ownership of the Hebrides. The war consisted of mainly skirmishes and feuds between the kings, and the only major battle was the indecisive Battle of Largs.

Background

Both the Hebrides and the Isle of Man had come under Norwegian influence dating to the reign of King Harald Fairhair of Norway. Norwegian control had been formalised in 1098, when Edgar, King of Scotland signed the islands over to King Magnus III of Norway, setting the boundary between Scots and Norwegian claims in the west. The Scottish acceptance came after the Norwegian king had imposed more direct royal control over the Hebrides as well as Orkney and the Isle of Man in a swift campaign earlier the same year, directed against the local Norse-Gaelic leaders of the various islands. In Norwegian terms, the islands were the Suðreyjar, meaning Southern Isles.

The Norwegian suzerainty over the Hebrides had been contested since the 1240s, when the Scottish king, Alexander II, began asking King Haakon IV of Norway if he could purchase the islands from him. For almost a decade these attempts were unsuccessful, and the negotiations ceased for thirteen years after Alexander II died. When his son, Alexander III, came to power in 1262 by obtaining majority support among the clansmen, he sent Haakon a final request saying that if Haakon did not sell them the islands they would take them by force.

War (1262–1263)
Haakon responded to this request by gathering a fleet of over 120 leidang warships and setting out in July 1263 to defend the Isles. Haakon stopped at the Isle of Arran where negotiations were started. Knowing Haakon had to win a decisive victory before the winter, Alexander III stalled during the negotiations until the autumn storms. In October 1263, several of Haakon's ships became stranded at Largs in stormy weather. A rescue party was sent ashore to help salvage the ships, where the Scottish forces launched a surprise attack, and a minor skirmish followed which ended indecisively. The following morning, Haakon's forces sailed back to Orkney for the winter, where he died in December. Haakon's successor, King Magnus VI of Norway, had problems at home and lacked the funding to launch a new expedition.

Resolution
Although the war was not really decided while Haakon was king, he was a major player in the events leading up to the conflict. Alexander III captured the Hebrides in 1264, and then made another formal claim to the islands which were bought from Norway for 4,000 marks, and 100 every year after under the terms of Treaty of Perth, by which the Scots at the same time recognised Norwegian rule over Shetland and Orkney.

See also
History of the Outer Hebrides
Lord of the Isles
Scandinavian Scotland

References

Other sources
Armit, Ian (2006) Scotland's Hidden History (Stroud. Tempus) 
Barrett, James H. "The Norse in Scotland" in Brink, Stefan (ed) (2008) The Viking World (Abingdon. Routledge) 
Crawford, Barbara E. (1987) Scandinavian Scotland (Leicester University Press) 
Graham-Campbell, James and Batey, Colleen E. (1998) Vikings in Scotland: An Archaeological Survey (Edinburgh University Press) 
Haswell-Smith, Hamish (2004) The Scottish Islands (Edinburgh: Canongate) .
McDonald, R. Andrew (1998) The Kingdom of the Isles: Scotland's Western Seaboard, 1100–c1336 (Tuckwell Press, Ltd. ) 
Murray, W. H. (1973) The Islands of Western Scotland (London. Eyre Methuen) 
Simpson, Grant. G. (ed) (1990) Scotland and Scandinavia 800-1800 (John Donald) 
Woolf, Alex (ed.) (2009) Scandinavian Scotland – Twenty Years After (St Andrews. St Andrews University Press) 

 
Wars involving Norway
Wars involving Scotland
1260s in Scotland
Scandinavian Scotland
1260s conflicts
Military history of Norway
Norway–Scotland relations
13th century in Norway
Military action involving Scottish islands